Agnidra alextoba is a moth in the family Drepanidae. It was described by Ulf Buchsbaum in 2000. It is found on Sumatra.

The wingspan is 32–39 mm for males and 36–42 mm for females. The ground colour is yellowish brown.

References

Moths described in 2000
Drepaninae
Moths of Indonesia